The 1923 Pan American Treaty to avoid or prevent conflicts between the American States was signed at the Fifth International Conference of American States in Santiago, Chile, on May 3, 1923. It was signed by the governments of Argentina, Brazil, Chile, Colombia, Cuba, Dominican Republic, Ecuador, Guatemala, Haiti, Honduras, Nicaragua, Panama, Paraguay, United States, Uruguay and Venezuela. The treaty consisted of ten articles and provided for the establishment of a Pan-American commission of inquiry to investigate all grievances between American states. It obliged all American states to refrain from any mobilization of their armed forces against one another even in the worst case of disagreement in all matters. It was registered in League of Nations Treaty Series on March 3, 1925.

Legacy of the treaty
The treaty was a step in a series of international efforts taken to prevent future wars, which culminated at the Kellogg-Briand Pact.

See also
 Kellogg–Briand Pact

References

External links
 Text of the treaty

Treaties of Argentina
Treaties concluded in 1923
Treaties of the First Brazilian Republic
Treaties of Chile
Treaties of Colombia
Treaties of Cuba
Treaties of the Dominican Republic
Treaties of Ecuador
Treaties of Guatemala
Treaties of Honduras
Treaties of Nicaragua
Treaties of Panama
Treaties of the United States
Treaties of Uruguay
Treaties of Venezuela
Treaties entered into force in 1925